Brooklawnia cerclae is a Gram-positive, non-spore-forming, facultatively anaerobic and non-motile bacterium which has been isolated from chlorosolvent-contaminated groundwater in Baton Rouge, Louisiana in the United States.

References 

Propionibacteriales
Bacteria described in 2006
Monotypic bacteria genera